Group C of the 2019 AFC Asian Cup took place from 7 to 16 January 2019. The group consists of South Korea, China PR, Kyrgyzstan and the Philippines. The top two teams, South Korea and China PR, along with third-placed Kyrgyzstan (as one of the four best third-placed teams), advanced to the round of 16.

South Korea was the only former champion in the group, having won both 1956 and 1960 editions. The Philippines and Kyrgyzstan both made debuts in the tournament.

Teams

Notes

Standings

In the round of 16:
 The winners of Group C, South Korea, advanced to play the third-placed team of Group A, Bahrain.
 The runners-up of Group C, China PR, advanced to play the runners-up of Group A, Thailand.
 The third-placed team of Group C, Kyrgyzstan, advanced to play the winners of Group A, the United Arab Emirates (as one of the four best third-placed teams).

Matches
All times listed are GST (UTC+4).

China PR vs Kyrgyzstan
Kyrgyzstan and China last played against each other in a friendly which ended in a 2–0 win for China.

Wu Lei had China's first effort at goal when he shot straight at Pavel Matyash in the 9th minute. Wu Xi shot just wide following a lay-off from Wu Lei before Gao Lin’s lofted, curling delivery from the left skipped away from a sliding Yu Dabao at the far post and bounced to safety. Mirlan Murzaev’s headed flick found Akhlidin Israilov on the edge of the area and the midfielder volleyed home via the inside of Yan Junling’s left post. Five minutes into the second half, Valery Kichin's attempted headed clearance from a corner went straight up and Matyash, in trying to tip the ball over his crossbar, pushed it into his own net off the woodwork. Twelve minutes later, Wu Xi headed over the bar at the end of a move involving Zhang Linpeng and Gao Lin while Wu Lei also saw his headed attempt clear the goal in the 71st minute. With 12 minutes remaining China took the lead when Wu Xi’s header directed Liu Yang’s long ball from the back into Yu’s path who slotted his shot beyond Matyash.

South Korea vs Philippines
This match was the first meeting between South Korea and the Philippines in 39 years with the last meeting in 1980 ending in an 8–0 win for the Koreans.

South Korea were awarded a free-kick after Luke Woodland fouled Koo Ja-cheol outside the box. Jung Woo-young's resulting strike missed the top left corner of the net by inches. Five minutes from the break, Lee Yong's pass into the penalty box found Hwang Ui-jo, who then turned to unleash a shot but Philippines goalkeeper Michael Falkesgaard made a save to deny him. Moments later, South Korea goalkeeper Kim Seung-gyu parried away Javier Patiño’s volley, that began from a counter-attack after Daisuke Sato intercepted a pass and released a cross to the forward. Ten minutes into the second half, Patiño's shot was saved by Kim. South Korea sent on Hwang In-beom and Lee Chung-yong and less than three minutes later, Lee's pass found Hwang Hee-chan, whose back pass set Ui-jo to open the scoring from close range in the 67th minute. Phil Younghusband replaced John-Patrick Strauß in the final minute of the game, but South Korea held on to claim the win.

Philippines vs China PR
The last match played between the two sides, a friendly in 2017, concluded in an 8–1 win for the Chinese.

The Philippines threatened to break the deadlock in the 23rd minute when Patrick Reichelt and John-Patrick Strauß combined to set-up Javier Patiño whose goalbound effort was blocked by defender Feng Xiaoting. However, after Wu Xi had flashed a header narrowly wide, China went ahead on 40 minutes, Wu Lei received Hao Junmin's pass and finished from 12 yards past Michael Falkesgaard. In the final moments of the first half, Chinese custodian Yan Junling made a fine save to deny Kevin Ingreso and maintain his side's slender advantage. After the break, Wu Lei's angled volley forced Falkesgaard into a save, before he bagged his second of the game with a finish from Hao's 66th minute free-kick. Falkesgaard then pulled off another stop to deny Wu Lei once again, only for Yu Dabao to add a third in the 80th minute when he headed home from a corner just 19 seconds after coming on as a substitute.

Kyrgyzstan vs South Korea
Twelve minutes into the game, Kutman Kadyrbekov dropped to his left to keep out Koo Ja-cheol's low strike form 25 yards and Tamirlan Kozubaev blocked Hwang Ui-jo's attempt to slot home the rebound. Eleven minutes from the break, Bekzhan Sabynbaev's shot from close range was saved by Kim Seung-gyu. Lee Chung-yong fired over the bar in the 36th minute while Koo shot from distance, only for Kadyrbekov to make another save. The resulting corner by Hong Chul found Kim Min-jae who powered his downward header between Kadyrbekov's legs and over the line. In the 68th minute, Ui-jo's header came back off the crossbar and bounced on the goal line before Kozubaev headed it to safety. Five minutes later, Ui-jo saw another attempt hit the woodwork, this time after Chung-yong's cross-field ball set him up to shoot, Kadyrbekov somehow touched the ball onto the crossbar. A minute later, Hwang Hee-chan managed to clip the top of the crossbar from a central position. But in the end, Min-jae's goal was enough to see off Kyrgyzstan and take the two-time champions into the next phase of the competition.

South Korea vs China PR
Chinese goalkeeper Yan Junling denied Hwang Ui-jo in quick succession and Kim Min-jae headed Son Heung-min’s corner narrowly wide on 8 minutes. Five minutes later, South Korea were ahead. Son weaved his way into the Chinese penalty area before being brought down by Shi Ke’s outstretched leg. Ui-jo scored from the spot to hand his side an early lead. China could have drawn level in the 19th minute when Jin Jingdao latched onto Zhao Xuri’s pass but proceeded to fire his shot over the bar with only goalkeeper Kim Seung-gyu to beat. Shortly after that, Hwang Hee-chan’s effort forced Yan into another stop and Ui-jo hit the upright from a curling effort. Within six minutes of the restart, the Koreans scored a second, with Min-jae finding the target with a header from a Son corner. Shortly before the hour mark, Jung Woo-young headed Son’s free kick just over the bar and then, at the other end, Wu Xi flashed a well-placed shot off target. Hee-chan sent a header wide off the far post as South Korea held on to the score.

Kyrgyzstan vs Philippines
Vitalij Lux gave Kyrgyzstan the lead in the 24th minute from a side foot effort into the top corner following Akhlidin Israilov's low, hard cross. Israilov fired narrowly over the crossbar and Lux hit the upright, but despite a tally of 15 shots at goal to their opponents' two, Kyrgyzstan were unable to add to their lead before the half-time whistle. Lux turned and fired the ball into the top corner from Bekzhan Sagynbaev's pass in the 51st minute to score his second of the day. Javier Patiño forced goalkeeper Kutman Kadyrbekov into a low save. Then, head coach Sven-Göran Eriksson introduced Phil Younghusband and James Younghusband into the fray. Lux completed his hat-trick in the 77th minute when he struck Mirlan Murzaev's woodwork-bound initial effort from close range. Stephan Schröck scored from a long-range free kick three minutes later to give the Philippines their first ever goal at the tournament.

Discipline
Fair play points were used as tiebreakers if the head-to-head and overall records of teams were tied (and if a penalty shoot-out was not applicable as a tiebreaker). These were calculated based on yellow and red cards received in all group matches as follows:
yellow card = 1 point
red card as a result of two yellow cards = 3 points
direct red card = 3 points
yellow card followed by direct red card = 4 points

Only one of the above deductions was applied to a player in a single match.

References

External links
 

Group C
2019 in South Korean football
2019 in Chinese football
2019 in Philippine football